Châteauneuf-sur-Cher is a commune in the Cher department in the Centre-Val de Loire region of France.

Geography

Population

Sights
 The nineteenth-century church of Notre-Dame.
 A thirteenth-century castle.
 The twelfth-century church at the hamlet of Marigny.
 The winegrowers’ stone cabin at Marigny.

Personalities
Ernest-Francois Mallard  (1833–1894), mineralogist was born here.

See also
Communes of the Cher department

References

External links

Châteauneuf-sur-Cher Basilica

Communes of Cher (department)
Berry, France